The  was an infantry division of the Imperial Japanese Army. It was formed on 2 April 1945 in Kurume as a triangular division. It was one of a batch of eight divisions composed of the 201st, 202nd, 205th, 206th, 209th, 212th, 214th and 216th Divisions created as part of the reaction to the Battle of Okinawa.

History
On 11 June 1945, the 212th Division organization and deployment was complete. The 516th and 518th Infantry Regiments, together with service units, were in Tsuno, Miyazaki, while the 517th infantry regiment was in Kurume It did not see any combat by the time of the surrender of Japan on 15 August 1945.

See also
 List of Japanese Infantry Divisions

Notes and references
This article incorporates material from Japanese Wikipedia page 第212師団 (日本軍), accessed 20 July 2016
 Madej, W. Victor, Japanese Armed Forces Order of Battle, 1937–1945 [2 vols], Allentown, PA: 1981.

Japanese World War II divisions
Infantry divisions of Japan
Military units and formations established in 1945
Military units and formations disestablished in 1945
1945 establishments in Japan
1945 disestablishments in Japan